Colobothina perplexa is a species of beetle in the family Cerambycidae, and the only species in the genus Colobothina. It was described by Hovore in 1989.

References

Colobotheini
Beetles described in 1989
Monotypic Cerambycidae genera